Action-adventure game is a video game genre that combines elements of adventure games and action games.

Action-adventure may also refer to:
 Action-adventure fiction, a hybrid of the action and adventure genres
 Action-adventure film, a hybrid of the action and adventure film genres
 Action-Adventure, a working title for a Retro Studios video game whose assets were later used for Metroid Prime
 Action/Adventure (album), a 2004 album by Dealership (band)